Rayongwittayakhompaknam School (is a state-run secondary school located in the city of Rayong, Thailand.

History 
In 1992, Provost Pitak Rattakhet abbot of Wat Pak Nam expressed his desire to use the 11 rai of land for construction of a secondary school to Mr. Mungkorn Kullawanit the director of Rayongwittayakhom School at the time. After listening to the abbot Mr. Mungkorn agreed to the idea so he took it to the Ministry of Education officials in Rayong. After reviewing the abbots and Mr. Mungkorns proposal the Minister of Education at the time Mr. Bunjong Phongsaht came to Rayong for a meeting with Mr. Mungkorn and other officials. After the meeting and carefully examining the 11 rai of land Mr. Bunjong approved the proposal and on February 22, 1994, Rayongwittaykhompaknam School was officially established by the Ministry of Education .

On March 14, 1994, the Regional office of Secondary Education allocated the budget for the construction of a 318 L/30 (Special) building which has 4 levels with built-in toilets. On June 16, 1994, the Ministry of Education ordered the appointment of Mr. Manhop Ngamsuwan as the first-ever director of Rayongwittayakom Paknam School.

Curriculum 

Mattayom 1-6

Science- Maths
English- Maths
English- Chinese
Physicsal Education

Future Proposals 

On July 30, 2013, the school was granted 23,440,000 Baht from the Ministry of Education to build a 324.L Building which is the same in design as the current Phitak Rattakhet building but slightly different. It has four levels.

The school has announced plans to replace the current football pitch with astroturf. As of August 15, 2013 work has begun.

References

External links 
 Rayongwittayakhompaknam Official Page

Rayong province
Schools in Thailand